St. Aloysius' School may refer to:

 Secondary schools
 St Aloysius English Medium School, Thanikella, Khammam, India
 St Aloysius' Anglo-Indian High School, Visakhapatnam, India
 St. Aloysius Gonzaga Secondary School, in Mississauga, Ontario, Canada
 St. Aloysius Gonzaga Secondary School, a Jesuit high school, in Kibera, Nairobi, Kenya
 St. Aloysius High School, Kanpur
 St. Aloysius High School, Nallasopara  Nala Sopara
 St. Aloysius Higher Secondary School, Kollam, India
 St. Aloysius' Orphanage & Day School Howrah.
 St. Aloysius Senior Secondary School, Jabalpur, India
 St. Aloysius High School (Vicksburg, Mississippi)
 Sint-Aloysius College, a secondary school in Ninove, Belgium
 SMU St. Aloysius Bandung, Saint Aloysius Secondary and High School, in Bandung, Indonesia
 Gonzaga Preparatory School, a secondary school in Spokane, Washington

 Primary schools
 St. Aloysius primary school, in Lisburn, Northern Ireland
 St. Aloysius primary school and parish, in Pottstown, PA, US
 St. Aloysius Church and Primary School, in Limbanak, Sabah Malaysia
 St. Aloysius Elementary and Junior High School, in Bowling Green, OH, US
 St. Aloysius RC Primary School, in Oxford
 St. Aloysius Primary School, in Chapelhall, Scotland
 Other schools
St. Aloysius Academy, in Bryn Mawr, PA, US.
St. Aloysius Church, in Baton Rouge, LA, US, which is also an elementary school/middle school
St. Aloysius Church and Catholic school, in Sauk City, WI, US
St. Aloysius Church and school, Yoder, IN, US
St. Aloysius Gonzaga Parish and School, Sheperdsville, KY, US
St. Aloysius Parish and School, Jackson, NJ, US
St. Aloysius Parish and School, Pewee Valley, KY, US
St. Aloysius-on-the-Ohio Church and School, Cincinnati, OH, US

St.Aloysius Orphanage and Day School,
Howrah, West Bengal, India